The Strange Case of the Man and the Beast (Spanish: El Extraño caso del hombre y la bestia) is a 1951 Argentine film.

Cast
Rodolfo Crespi was cast and played Mozo. 
Rafael Frontura played as himself.

External links
 

1951 films
1950s Spanish-language films
Argentine black-and-white films
1950s Argentine films